The Guenete Leul Palace ("Paradise of Princes") is a palace in Addis Ababa, Ethiopia. It was built by Emperor Haile Selassie in 1930. The Emperor and his family made the palace their main residence, but the seat of government remained at the Imperial Palace.

History 
After the Second Italo-Ethiopian War and the Italian occupation of Ethiopia, the palace became the residence of the Viceroy and Governor-General of Italian East Africa. Emperor Haile Selassie moved back to the palace when he returned from exile after the East African campaign of World War II. During the 1960 coup attempt, several government officials were massacred in the palace. In light of this, the Emperor moved to the Jubilee Palace.

The emperor gave the Guenete Leul Palace to the Haile Selassie University, which was renamed Addis Ababa University in 1974. The palace was renamed Ras Makonnen Hall after the father of the Emperor.

References

External links
Website related to Ethiopian palaces

Royal residences in Ethiopia
Buildings and structures in Addis Ababa
Palaces in Ethiopia
Houses completed in 1930
20th-century architecture in Ethiopia